Yenne is an unincorporated community in Lost River Township, Martin County, in the U.S. state of Indiana.

History
A post office was established at Yenne in 1897, and remained in operation until it was discontinued in 1906. The community was likely named for Samuel P. Yenne, postmaster of nearby Shoals.

Geography

References

Unincorporated communities in Martin County, Indiana
Unincorporated communities in Indiana